State Route 55 is a short highway that loops around the town of Price in central Utah, United States, beginning and ending at US-6/US-191 in a span of three miles (5 km). It is an old routing of US-6 and US-50. The entire route is co-signed with U.S. Route 6 Business.

Route description
From its western terminus at the offramp of US-6/US-191, the highway goes east on 100 North. At its junction 300 East, it turns south briefly before returning east on Main Street. It continues on Main Street, which veers to the south until meeting again with another grade-separated intersection.

The route is listed as part of the National Highway System.

History

The route through downtown Price had been designated SR-8 early in the state highway system's history; it would also become US-50 in 1926 and US-6 in 1937. The underlying state route designation was changed to SR-27 in 1969, but otherwise the routes did not change. However, by the 1970s, a new super-two bypass of the city center was being built for long-distance through traffic. As a result, the U.S. routes were moved onto this bypass, and the modern iteration of SR-55 was created in 1975 on the old routing of US 6/50. Since then, the route has not been changed.

Major intersections

References

External links

055
 055